Paul S. Rouleau is a justice of the Court of Appeal for Ontario, Canada. He was the commissioner of the Public Order Emergency Commission that conducted the Inquiry into Emergencies Act mandated by law to study and report on the circumstances that led to the invoking of the Emergencies Act on February 14, 2022 by the government of Prime Minister Justin Trudeau during the Canada convoy protests.

Education 
Rouleau received his Bachelor of Administration in 1974 and his LL.B in 1977, both from the University of Ottawa. He received a Masters in Law from York University in 1984.

Career 
Rouleau was a partner with the law firms Cassels Brock & Blackwell from his call to the Bar in 1979 to 1987, Genest Murray, DesBrisay, Lamek from 1987 to 2000, and Heenan Blaikie from 2000 to 2002.

In 1983, Rouleau was part of John Turner’s campaign for leadership of the Liberal Party of Canada after Pierre Trudeau announced retirement. He then helped pick Turner’s cabinet once he won leadership of the Liberal Party of Canada. Contemporary media reports described him as either Turner's executive assistant or appointments secretary.

Rouleau was appointed as a Justice of the Ontario Superior Court of Justice and to the Court of Appeal for Ontario in 2005. He was appointed as a Deputy Judge of the Supreme Court of Yukon in 2014, Nunavut Court of Justice in 2017 and Supreme Court of the Northwest Territories in 2017.

Since his appointments, Justice Rouleau has been involved in the continuing legal education of judges and lawyers. He chairs the Ontario Attorney General’s Access to Justice in French Advisory Committee and serves on the board for the Law Commission of Ontario. Rouleau was also a founding member of the Association des juristes d’expression française de l’Ontario and was its President from 1985 to 1987. He has also served as Trustee of the Metropolitan Toronto Separate School Board from 1986 to 1991.

He is the recipient of several awards and recognitions, including an Honorary Doctorate of Laws from York University and the Ordre des francophones d’Amérique, awarded by the Conseil supérieur de la langue française du Québec. In 2005, he was inducted into the Common Law Honour Society of the University of Ottawa.

Emergencies Act inquiry 
On April 25, 2022, Prime Minister Trudeau selected Rouleau to be the commissioner of the Public Order Emergency Commission inquiry into the invocation of the Emergencies Act, which had occurred in response to the 2022 Canada convoy protest. In February 2023, on behalf of the commission, he concluded that the threshold for invocation of the Emergencies Act was met.

References

Justices of the Court of Appeal for Ontario
University of Ottawa Faculty of Law alumni
Canada convoy protest